Cauchas florella is a moth of the Adelidae family. It is found in Russia and Turkey.

References

Moths described in 1871
Adelidae
Moths of Asia
Moths of Europe